The following is a list of the 12 municipalities (comuni) of the Province of Ragusa, Sicily, Italy.

List

See also
List of municipalities of Italy

References

Ragusa